This is a complete list of drivers who raced in the A1 Grand Prix series, from its inception in 2005–06 until its final season in 2008–09.

Over the series' 39 rounds (totaling 78 races), 134 different drivers entered at least one A1 Grand Prix race.  Switzerland's Neel Jani holds the records for most rounds entered (30), most race starts (60), total wins (10), and points (413).  Jani is tied with Nico Hülkenberg for most feature race wins (6), and with Alexandre Prémat and Jonny Reid for most sprint race wins (4).

A1 Grand Prix pointscoring systems varied according to seasons. If necessary, a small flag indicates the nationality of the driver if it is different from the associated A1 Team.

List of drivers

Notes

References

External links 
 Drivers statistics on A1 Grand Prix official website

Drivers
 
A1 Grand Prix